Skan or SKAN may refer to:

People
David "Skan" Bichard, Australian punk musician, member of Carpathian (band)
Christina Skan, Swedish brewer, founder of Wermlands Brygghus
Martin Skan, English hotelier, former owner of Chewton Glen
Ralph Skan, English singer, soloist on Peace (Libera album)
Sylvia Skan (1897–1972), English mathematician
Skan Srisuwan, artist for video game No More Heroes III and other games

Places
SKAN, abbreviation for Saint Kitts and Nevis
SKAN, ICAO airport code for Andes Airport in Andes, Colombia

Other
Škaŋ, the motion of the universe in Lakota tradition
Škan, American extreme metal band
Skan (album), 1979, by UK band Twelfth Night
Skan', a kind of Russian jewelry art
SKAN, abbreviation for Russian bandy club SKA-Neftyanik
Skan, fictional character in 2003 animated film The Rain Children
The sKan, cancer detection device, winner of 2017 James Dyson Award

See also
Scan (disambiguation)
Fenno–Skan, power transmission cable between Sweden and Finland
Konti–Skan, power transmission cable between Sweden and Denmark